Taro Hirose (born June 30, 1996) is a Canadian professional ice hockey player for the Grand Rapids Griffins in the American Hockey League (AHL) as a prospect for the Detroit Red Wings of the National Hockey League (NHL).

Playing career

High school
Hirose attended Edge School from 2011–14, where he posted 31 goals and 39 assists in 48 career Midget Prep Division games and 24 goals and 14 assists in 25 career Midget Varsity Division games. He won the Canadian Sport School Hockey League (CSSHL) Midget Prep Championship in 2013, and posted 21 goals and 22 assists in 27 games in 2014, and was subsequently named the CSSHL Midget Prep Division MVP.

Junior
During the 2014–15 season, Hirose recorded 18 goals and 32 assists in 58 games for the Salmon Arm Silverbacks, and was named the teams Rookie of the Year. In the 2015–16 season, he was elected an alternate captain for the Silverbacks, where he recorded 15 goals and 56 assists in 58 games, leading the team in scoring. In April 2015, Hirose committed to play for Michigan State University.

College
Hirose began his collegiate career for the Michigan State Spartans during the 2016–17 season. He recorded six goals and 18 assists in 34 games, ranking second on the team in scoring. His 24 points were the most points by a Spartan freshman since 2009–10. He recorded his first career goal and assist on October 28, 2016 against Princeton, becoming the first Spartan since 2009 to score his first collegiate goal while shorthanded.

During the 2017–18 season, he recorded 12 goals and 30 assists in 36 games for the Spartans. His team-leading 42 points were the most by a Spartan since Corey Tropp had 42 points in 2009–10, while his 30 assists were the most by a Spartan since Jim Slater in 2004–05. He led the Big Ten during the regular season in power-play assists (16) and was tied for first in power-play points (17), while he ranked second in the Big Ten in points (40) and assists (28). Following his outstanding season, he was named to the All-Big Ten Second Team.

During the 2018–19 season, Hirose was the Big Ten Scoring Champion, recording 10 goals and 24 assists in 34 conference games. He also led the NCAA in points (50), points-per-game (1.47), assists (35), multi-point games (15), and three-point games (9). His 50 points were the most by a Spartan since John-Michael Liles had 50 points in 2002–03, while his 35 assists were the most by a Spartan since Brad Fast had 35 assists in 2002–03. Following an outstanding season, he was named the Big Ten Player of the Year, and named to the All-Big Ten First Team, and AHCA/CCM First Team All-American. He was also named a finalist for the Hobey Baker Award.

Professional
On March 12, 2019, Hirose signed a two-year, entry-level contract with the Detroit Red Wings. He made his NHL debut on March 19 in a game against the New York Rangers, playing on the third line along with Frans Nielsen and Thomas Vanek. He recorded his first career NHL point, assisting on Nielsen's goal in the first period. On March 31, Hirose recorded his first career NHL goal against Jaroslav Halák of the Boston Bruins.

On January 12, 2021, the Red Wings assigned Hirose to the Grand Rapids Griffins. On July 27, 2021, the Red Wings signed Hirose to a one-year contract extension. However, he only appeared in six contests for the Red Wings in said season, adding only two assists over that span.

Hirsoe would play just 15 games for the Detroit Red Wings in the 2021–22 season scoring 4 points but was a big contributor with the Grand Rapids Griffins where he scored 53 points in 59 games. On May 22, 2022, Hirose was signed to a two-year contract extension with the Red Wings.

Career statistics

Awards and honours

References

External links
 

1996 births
Living people
Canadian ice hockey left wingers
Canadian sportspeople of Japanese descent
Detroit Red Wings players
Grand Rapids Griffins players
Michigan State Spartans men's ice hockey players
Salmon Arm Silverbacks players
Ice hockey people from Winnipeg
Undrafted National Hockey League players
AHCA Division I men's ice hockey All-Americans